Events in the year 1608 in Scotland.

Incumbents

Monarch – James VI

Events

Architecture 
May 8 – Works by Bevis Bulmer commence at a newly nationalized silver mine at Hilderston, West Lothian.
Tullibole Castle constructed

Sport
The Lanark Silver Bell (horse racing trophy) established

Births

James Steuart of Coltness, merchant, banker, landowner, politician and Covenanter (d. 1681).

Deaths
26 February – Thomas Craig, jurist and poet (born c.1538)
15 May – Archibald Napier landowner and official, master of the Scottish mint and seventh Laird of Merchiston (b. 1534)
9 November – John Graham, 3rd Earl of Montrose, peer, Chancellor of the University of St Andrews and Lord High Commissioner to the Parliament of Scotland (b. 1548).

Full date missing 
George Bannatyne, merchant, collector of Scottish poems (b. 1545)
Alexander Campbell of Carco, noble and prelate 
William Barclay, jurist (b. 1546)

References